Sokyriany Raion was an administrative raion (district) in the southern part of Chernivtsi Oblast in western Ukraine, on the Romanian border. It was part of the historical region of Bessarabia. The raion was abolished on 18 July 2020 as part of the administrative reform of Ukraine, which reduced the number of raions of Chernivtsi Oblast to three. The area of Sokyriany Raion was merged into Dnistrovskyi Raion. The last estimate of the raion population was 

At the time of disestablishment, the raion consisted of two hromadas, Sokyriany urban hromada with the administration in Sokyriany and Vashkivtsi rural hromada with the administration in the selo of Vashkivtsi.

See also
Subdivisions of Ukraine

References

External links
 Web page on the website of Regional State Administration 

Former raions of Chernivtsi Oblast
1966 establishments in Ukraine
Ukrainian raions abolished during the 2020 administrative reform